The 2013–14 Scottish Premiership was the first season of the Scottish Premiership, the highest division of Scottish football. The season began on 2 August 2013 and concluded on 11 May 2014. This was the first season of the competition being part of the newly formed Scottish Professional Football League after the merger of the Scottish Premier League and the Scottish Football League. This season also featured the introduction of an end of season play-off between the 11th-placed team in the top flight and the teams placed 2nd–4th in the Scottish Championship, to determine whether a second team will be relegated from the league.

Twelve teams contested the league. Partick Thistle (champions) were promoted from the 2012–13 First Division, replacing Dundee (relegated). Heart of Midlothian were deducted 15 points (one-third of the previous season's total) for entering administration during the close season.

On 26 March, Celtic clinched their third title in a row and 45th in total after a 5–1 away win against Partick Thistle.
It is the earliest that the title has been won since the 1928–29 season, when Rangers won it on 16 March, until the 2020-2021 Season when Rangers won the title on 7 March.

Teams

Dundee were relegated from the 2012–13 Scottish Premier League. Partick Thistle, who won the 2012–13 Scottish First Division, were promoted.

Stadia and locations

Personnel and kits

Note: Flags indicate national team as has been defined under FIFA eligibility rules. Players may hold more than one non-FIFA nationality.

Managerial changes

League table

Results

Matches 1–22
Teams play each other twice, once at home, once away.

Matches 23–33
Teams play every other team once (either at home or away).

Matches 34–38
After 33 matches, the league splits into two sections of six teams each, with teams playing every other team in their section once (either at home or away). The exact matches are determined upon the league table at the time of the split.

Top six

Bottom six

Season statistics
Celtic goalkeeper Fraser Forster set a new Scottish league record for length of time played without conceding a goal, which had been previously set by Bobby Clark in 1970–71. Forster's streak ended at 1,256 minutes.

Top scorers

Assists

Premiership play-offs
For the first time since the 1996–97 season, promotion and relegation involving a place in the top division of the Scottish football league system was determined in part by a play-off system. The previous system used was a straight head-to-head between the team that had finished 9th (second bottom) in the Premier Division and the runner-up in the First Division. The new system involved the teams from second to fourth place in the Championship, with the first contest between the third and fourth place teams. The winner progressed to a tie with the second place Championship team. The winner of that second tie then progressed to the promotion and relegation deciding playoff against the 11th place team in the Premiership.

Quarter-final

First leg

Second leg

Falkirk won 4–3 on aggregate, advanced to Semi-final.

Semi-final

First leg

Second leg

Hamilton Academical won 2–1 on aggregate, advanced to Final.

Final

First leg

Second leg

2–2 on aggregate. Hamilton Academical won 4–3 on penalties, earning promotion to the Premiership. Hibernian were relegated to the Championship.

See also
Nine in a row

References

External links
Official Site 

Scottish Premiership seasons
1
1
scot